Michael Jackel (born October 19, 1959 in Vancouver, British Columbia) is a Canadian–German retired professional basketball player. A 6’7' tall small forward, he won the EuroBasket 1993 with the senior German men's national team, and he was the first player to score more than 10,000 points in Germany's top-tier level Basketball Bundesliga.

College career
The son of German parents who had migrated to Canada, Jackel played college basketball at Simon Fraser University, from 1978 to 1982. He scored 1,940 points for the Clan, leaving as the second leading scorer in SFU history, behind Jay Triano. Posting 28.9 points per contest, he led the NAIA in scoring his senior year (1981–82), which earned him NAIA All-America Second Team honors that season. He was inducted into the SFU Hall of Fame in 1994.

Professional career
Jackel spent his 17-year professional career entirely in the German top-flight Basketball Bundesliga, playing for Wolfenbüttel (1982), Göttingen (1982–1985), Köln (1985–1988; 1989–1990), DBV Charlottenburg (1988–1989), Bamberg (1990–1997) and Braunschweig (1997–1999). He won four German League championships and four German Cup titles. In December 1996, Jackel became the first player in the Bundesliga to surpass the 10,000 point mark, and he finished his professional career in 1999, with 10,783 total points scored, which made him the all-time leading scorer in the league.

Following his professional career, Jackel returned to his native Canada.

National team career 
Between 1984 and 1993, Jackel won a total of 113 caps for the senior German men's national team, averaging 19.2 points per game. In the 1992 Summer Olympic Games, in Barcelona, he was Germany's second-leading scorer (14.1 points per game) behind Detlef Schrempf, and he had a 15-point performance against the Original Dream Team. At the EuroBasket 1993, he averaged 11 points a game, en route to the gold medal.

References 

1959 births
Living people
Basketball players at the 1992 Summer Olympics
Basketball people from British Columbia
BSC Saturn Köln players
Canadian men's basketball coaches
Canadian men's basketball players
Canadian people of German descent
German basketball coaches
German men's basketball players
Olympic basketball players of Germany
Simon Fraser Clan men's basketball players
Small forwards
Basketball players from Vancouver